Lower Elochoman is a census-designated place (CDP) in Wahkiakum County, Washington, United States. The population was 185 at the 2010 census.

References

Census-designated places in Washington (state)
Census-designated places in Wahkiakum County, Washington